Woods Cross is a city in Davis County, Utah, United States. It is part of the Ogden–Clearfield, Utah Metropolitan Statistical Area. The population was 9,761 as of the 2010 census, with an estimated population in 2019 of 11,431.

History

Daniel Wood

Woods Cross is named after Daniel Wood, an early settler in the Utah Territory. Wood (October 16, 1800 - April 15, 1892) was a Mormon pioneer and a settler of the western United States. He was the son of Henry Wood and Elizabeth Demelt. He was born in Dutchess County, New York and died in Woods Cross.

Geography and climate
Woods Cross is located in southeastern Davis County, bordered to the north by West Bountiful, to the east by Bountiful, and to the south by the city of North Salt Lake. The city lies along the Wasatch Front next to the Wasatch Mountain Range. Water is supplied by mountain springs and snowpack running off of the Wasatch Mountains. The climate varies greatly throughout the year, with very hot summers and mildly cold winters, with very pleasant spring and fall seasons separating the two. Precipitation is mainly accumulated in the winter and spring, but there is not enough to sustain any aquifers.

Demographics

As of 2009 estimates, there were 8,888 people, 1,936 households, and 1,589 families residing in the city. The population density was 1,783.2 people per square mile (688.4/km2). There were 2,021 housing units at an average density of 561.4 per square mile (216.8/km2). The racial makeup of the city was 93.75% White, 0.44% African American, 0.25% Native American, 0.70% Asian, 0.26% Pacific Islander, 2.55% from other races, and 2.04% from two or more races. Hispanic or Latino of any race were 5.72% of the population.

There were 1,936 households, out of which 52.4% had children under the age of 18 living with them, 67.4% were married couples living together, 10.4% had a female householder with no husband present, and 17.9% were non-families. 13.3% of all households were made up of individuals, and 2.6% had someone living alone who was 65 years of age or older. The average household size was 3.32 and the average family size was 3.69.

In the city, the population was spread out, with 36.0% under the age of 18, 13.0% from 18 to 24, 31.6% from 25 to 44, 15.7% from 45 to 64, and 3.7% who were 65 years of age or older. The median age was 26 years. For every 100 females, there were 100.0 males. For every 100 females age 18 and over, there were 100.8 males.

The median income for a household in the city was $46,271, and the median income for a family was $51,778. Males had a median income of $35,958 versus $22,917 for females. The per capita income for the city was $16,508. About 4.0% of families and 4.7% of the population were below the poverty line, including 5.7% of those under age 18 and 8.7% of those age 65 or over.

Education
Woods Cross is part of Davis School District. The city has one high school, Woods Cross High School, and two elementary schools, Odyssey Elementary and Woods Cross Elementary.

References

Further reading

External links
 City of Woods Cross official website

Cities in Davis County, Utah
Cities in Utah
Ogden–Clearfield metropolitan area
Populated places established in 1865